Morbid Tales is the debut EP by the Swiss extreme metal band, Celtic Frost, released in November 1984. The first European release on Noise Records was a mini-LP with six tracks, while the American release by Enigma/Metal Blade added two tracks, bringing it to the length of a regular LP.

In 1999 a remastered edition of Morbid Tales was released on CD by Noise Records, which also contained the tracks from their 1985 EP Emperor's Return as well as a 2017 remastered edition released by the same label on CD and vinyl formats.

Legacy 
The thrash metal intensity of Morbid Tales had a major influence on the then-developing death metal and black metal genres. It included elements that were adopted by the pioneers of both styles. The band's bleak and dead serious fashion style was also influential, including their corpse paint face makeup. In 2017, Rolling Stone ranked Morbid Tales as 28th on their list of 'The 100 Greatest Metal Albums of All Time.'

In the commentary for Darkthrone's album Panzerfaust, Fenriz cites this album along with Bathory's Under the Sign of the Black Mark and Vader's Necrolust as key riff inspirations.

"Danse Macabre" was later sampled in the demo track "Totgetanzt" from their 2002 demo album Prototype.

Track listings
All music by Thomas Gabriel Fischer, all lyrics by Thomas Gabriel Fischer and Martin Ain, except where noted.

European version

US version

1999 CD remastered edition

2017 remastered edition bonus tracks

Personnel
Credits adapted from the original editions.
Celtic Frost
Tom Warrior – guitars, lead vocals, co-producer
Martin Ain – bass, bass effects, vocals, co-producer
Reed St. Mark – drums on tracks 10–12 (remastered edition)

Additional musicians
Stephen Priestly – session drums
Horst Müller – additional vocals (tracks 3, 5 & 7)
Hertha Ohling – additional vocals (track 6)
Oswald Spengler – violin (tracks 7 & 8)

Production
Horst Müller – producer, engineer, mixing, mastering
Karl Walterbach – executive producer

References

Celtic Frost albums
Noise Records EPs
1984 debut EPs
Cthulhu Mythos music
Enigma Records EPs
Metal Blade Records EPs